Beatrice Hastings devant une porte is a 1915 painting by Amedeo Modigliani, depicting his then lover Beatrice Hastings. It is one of 14 portraits Modigliani painted of Hastings. In 2002 the painting was sold at auction for $4.2 million dollars to a private collector.

References

1915 paintings
Paintings by Amedeo Modigliani
Paintings of people